Rudolstadt is a town in the German federal state Thuringia, with the Thuringian Forest to the southwest, and to Jena and Weimar to the north.

The former capital of Schwarzburg-Rudolstadt, the town is built along the River Saale inside a wide valley surrounded by woods. Rudolstadt was founded in 776 and has had municipal law since 1326. The town's landmark is the Castle Heidecksburg which is enthroned on a hill above the old town. The former municipality Remda-Teichel was merged into Rudolstadt in January 2019.

Rudolstadt was once well known because of the Anchor Stone Blocks of the Toy Company Richter and porcelain factories, beginning with the establishment of the Volkstedt porcelain manufacture in 1762.

History

Early history 
There is archeological evidence of a hill fort on the Weinberg in Oberpreilipp from the time of the late Urnfield culture and the early Iron Age. A Celtic settlement followed the Germanic one and the affiliation with the Duchy of Thuringia. From the 6th century onwards, archeological records suggest Slavic settlement in the area.

The first documented mention of the place-name was in 776 as Rudolfestat (Rudolf's settlement) as a gift from Charlemagne to Hersfeld Abbey

Historical population 

Number of Inhabitants (from 1960 as of 31 December, unless otherwise indicated):

 Data since 1994: Thuringian Statistical Office
1 29 October
2 31 August

Culture
Rudolstadt hosts Germany's biggest folk, roots, and world music festival, TFF Rudolstadt (Tanz&FolkFest), taking place annually on the first full July weekend.

Rudolstadt is twinned with Letterkenny, Co. Donegal, Ireland.

Since 2012 Rudolstadt hosts Getting tough race (German wiki), Europe's hardest obstacle race.

The main sights of Rudolstadt on OpenstreetMap.

Economy
The headquarters of the EPC Group, a global engineering and construction company, are in Rudolstadt.

Arthur Schopenhauer wrote his dissertation in Rudolstadt. 

 Princess Anna Sophie of Schwarzburg-Rudolstadt, grandmother of King Leopold I of Belgium, great-grandmother to Albert, Prince Consort of the United Kingdom
 Christian Nikolaus Eberlein (1720–1788), historical painter
 Traugott Maximilian Eberwein, German composer, worked here as the composer in residence for the Rudolstadt theatre
 Philipp Heinrich Erlebach, German composer and choirmaster in Rudolstadt 
 Hans Fallada, German writer. He went to school in Rudolstadt, it was here that he killed his friend Hans Dietrich von Necker in a duel
 Ahasverus Fritsch, German poet and composer 
 Simone Lange, German politician (SPD)
 Franz Liszt, Hungarian composer worked here as the composer in residence for the Rudolstadt theatre
 Niccolò Paganini, Italian composer, worked here as the composer in residence for the Rudolstadt theatre
 Charlotte von Lengefeld (1766–1826), wife of Schiller
 Richard Wagner, German composer, worked here as the composer in residence for the Rudolstadt theatre

References

External links

  

 
776 establishments
Populated places established in the 8th century
Saalfeld-Rudolstadt
Schwarzburg-Rudolstadt
Towns in Thuringia